Bedfordshire County Cricket Club was established on 3 November 1899; prior to that a county club had existed before, with Bedfordshire competing in the first Minor Counties Championship in 1895. It has since played minor counties cricket from 1900 and played List A cricket from 1967 to 2005, using a different number of home grounds during that time. Their first home minor counties fixture in 1895 was against Hertfordshire at Bedford School, while their first home List A match came 72 years later against Northamptonshire in the 1967 Gillette Cup at Wardown Park, Luton. Bedfordshire have played the majority of their minor counties fixtures at Bedford School and Wardown Park.

The eighteen grounds that Bedfordshire have used for home matches since 1895 are listed below, with statistics complete through to the end of the 2014 season.

Grounds

List A
Below is a complete list of grounds used by Bedfordshire County Cricket Club when it was permitted to play List A matches. These grounds have also held Minor Counties Championship and MCCA Knockout Trophy matches.

Minor Counties
Below is a complete list of grounds used by Bedfordshire County Cricket Club in Minor Counties Championship and MCCA Knockout Trophy matches.

Notes

References

Bedfordshire County Cricket Club
Cricket grounds in Bedfordshire
Bedfordshire